Joachim is the name given to a European windstorm which caused major damage in much of Western Europe between December 16–17, 2011. Joachim explosively deepened under the influence of a shortwave trough during its development.

Impact
At least 400,000 people were without power in France.  In Brittany, on the north-western coast of France, the cargo ship TK Bremen was blown aground. The nineteen-man crew was evacuated by helicopter, and the ship later disassembled.

Major damage occurred on the Spanish coast.

Roofs and trees were blown away, and all navigation on the Swiss lakes was closed. In the canton of Bern, a tree fell onto the railway line between Tramelan and Tavannes. This caused a train to derail, and its forward cars fell into the forest; three passengers suffered minor injuries.

The wind was followed by polar air, and the rain turning to snow at high altitudes and descending into the plain caused serious conditions. Most of the major ski resorts in Valais were closed, as well as numerous roads and tunnels.

Air traffic was affected.

Aftermath
According to Perils AG, property insurers may face costs of €300 million from the storm.

References

Joachim
2011 in Switzerland
2011 in France
2011 meteorology
December 2011 events in Europe